The 2018 Chengdu Challenger was a professional tennis tournament played on hard courts. It was the 3rd edition of the tournament which was part of the 2018 ATP Challenger Tour. It took place in Chengdu, China between 30 July and 5 August 2018.

Singles main-draw entrants

Seeds

 1 Rankings are as of 23 July 2018.

Other entrants
The following players received wildcards into the singles main draw:
  Gao Xin
  Te Rigele
  Xia Zihao
  Zhang Zhizhen

The following player received entry into the singles main draw as an alternate:
  Arjun Kadhe

The following players received entry from the qualifying draw:
  Blake Ellis
  Miliaan Niesten
  Makoto Ochi
  Tak Khunn Wang

Champions

Singles

  Zhang Ze def.  Henri Laaksonen 2–6, 5–2 ret.

Doubles

  Gong Maoxin /  Zhang Ze def.  Mikhail Elgin /  Yaraslav Shyla 6–4, 6–4.

References

2018 ATP Challenger Tour
2018
2018 in Chinese tennis